Nepheronia, commonly called vagrants, is a genus of butterflies of the subfamily Pierinae endemic to Africa. For other vagrants, see the genus Eronia.

Species
Listed alphabetically:
Nepheronia argia (Fabricius, 1775) – large vagrant
 Nepheronia avatar (Moore, 1858)
Nepheronia buquetii (Boisduval, 1836) – plain vagrant or Buquet's vagrant
Nepheronia pharis (Boisduval, 1836)
Nepheronia thalassina (Boisduval, 1836) – Cambridge vagrant or blue vagrant
?Nepheronia usambara (Aurivillius, 1907)

References

 

 
Butterflies of Africa
Pieridae genera
Taxa named by Arthur Gardiner Butler